Morris Soller (1931) is a research professor in the Department of Genetics of the Hebrew University of Jerusalem. He is especially interested in livestock- and crop- genetics including trypanotolerance in cattle.

Early life and education
Soller was born in 1931 in Manhattan, New York City, USA At the age of 12 he was first inspired to learn about genetics by reading The Theory of the Gene by Thomas Hunt Morgan. While an undergraduate he read Jay Laurence Lush's Animal Breeding Plans and learned much from it  and interestingly would receive the award named for Lush 50 years later  see below. Soller also learned much from the writings of Ronald Fisher and Sewall Wright during this time. In 1951 he earned a Bachelor's Degree in Agriculture and then in 1956 both a Master's Degree in Applied Statistics and a Doctorate of Philosophy in Animal Breeding from Rutgers University. He would later return to his birth country for further postdoctoral education at Indiana University and Roosevelt University in biochemistry.

Research and teaching career
In 1957 he was hired by the Volcani Center as their senior scientist for animal breeding and by Bar-Ilan University as a senior lecturer of Biology and Genetics. He moved his family to Israel where they have lived most of their lives since. Between 1966 and 1972 Soller was a lecturer at Roosevelt University in the USA. In 1972 he returned to Israel to lecture at the Hebrew University of Jerusalem in their Department of Genetics. He would eventually become a full professor and emeritus professor in 2000. He has since continued actively in lecturing and research including sabbaticals as the Cotswold Visiting Scientist at Iowa State University, at the University of Illinois and elsewhere.

Soller is the originator of quantitative trait locus mapping and marker-assisted selection. He began noticing the statistical patterns and composing the mathematical tools that would be required for these techniques in 1974, while studying crop genetics and livestock genetics. He went on to collaborate with his students and peers to create the F2, backcrossing, full sib, half sib, granddaughter, AIL and selective DNA pooling techniques in QTL mapping. Along with other laboratories around the world, his group developed some of the earliest restriction fragment length polymorphism markers for cattle and microsatellite markers for chickens.

He has especially become known for using these techniques to analyse trypanotolerance in cattle, especially in the N'Dama breed. Soller has also applied QTL analysis to dairy traits and Marek's disease.

Professional recognition
1996  American Association for the Advancement of Science elected him a Fellow
1999  Awarded the Jay L. Lush Award by the American Dairy Science Association
2000  Chosen to give the A. B. Chapman Lecture of the University of Wisconsin
2000  Honorary doctorate from Iowa State University "for leading the way in the actual
discovery of genetic science"
2007  Honorary doctorate from the University of Liege, Belgium
2012  Honorary member of the International Society for Animal Genetics
2012  The journal Animal Genetics published a special issue in his honor.

Publications
 Soller had authored and coauthored over 170 peer reviewed publications, and many book chapters and encyclopedia articles. The organisms he has studied include cattle and chickens, but also extend to plants, viruses, mice, pigs and others.
 .
Popularly cited including by

 An autobiography Soller was invited to write by Annual Reviews

References

External links

1931 births
Academic staff of the Hebrew University of Jerusalem
People from Manhattan
Rutgers University alumni
Northwestern University faculty
Roosevelt University faculty
Indiana University faculty
Academic staff of Bar-Ilan University
Dairy farming in Israel
American agronomists
Israeli agronomists
Fellows of the American Association for the Advancement of Science
Living people
American emigrants to Israel